Irving Park is a railroad station on Metra's Union Pacific Northwest Line located in the Irving Park neighborhood of Chicago, Illinois. The station is elevated on a solid-fill embankment which parallels the Kennedy Expressway. It is located adjacent to a station of the same name on the Blue Line. The station contains two side platforms; the southwest platform serves outbound trains, and the northeast platform serves inbound trains. A third express track runs through Irving Park but does not stop there. Irving Park is located in the B zone in Metra's zone-based fare system. , Irving Park is the 110th busiest of Metra's 236 non-downtown stations, with an average of 439 weekday boardings.

As of April 25, 2022, Irving Park is served by 44 trains (22 in each direction) on weekdays, by 31 trains (16 inbound, 15 outbound) on Saturdays, and by 19 trains (nine inbound, 10 outbound) on Sundays. Weekend inbound train No. 706 stops at Irving Park on days with home Cubs games only. Otherwise, this train bypasses Irving Park.

Bus and rail connections
CTA Blue Line
Irving Park

CTA Buses
  53 Pulaski (Owl Service) 
  54A North Cicero/Skokie Blvd 
  80 Irving Park

References

External links
 
 Metra - Irving Park
 Irving Park Road entrance from Google Maps Street View

Metra stations in Chicago